Ernő Dohnányi completed his first symphony, unnumbered and entitled Symphony in F, in 1896, while a student of Hans von Koessler. It was never formally published, and although awarded the Hungarian King's Prize, it did not achieve significant critical acclaim. The work, like many of Dohnányi's early compositions, bears the imprint of Johannes Brahms, who had championed the young composer after hearing a performance of Dohnányi's Piano Quintet No. 1. The Symphony in F was given moderate attention after being recorded in 2011. It is approximately thirty minutes in length.

It requires 2 flutes, 2 oboes, 2 clarinets, 2 bassoons, 4 horns, 3 trumpets, 3 trombones, tuba, timpani and strings and while not published in his lifetime, exists in sketches and score at the National Széchényi Library, Budapest. It was premiered 2 June 1897, in Budapest with Gyula Erkel (son of Ferenc) conducting.

Form
Dohnányi wrote the work in the traditional four-movement symphonic format. He marks the score with the following:

Allegro  
Adagio  
Scherzo – Prestissimo  
Andante

Recording
In 2011, the symphony's premiere recording (and only recording to date) was conducted by László Kovács.

See also
Johannes Brahms
Hans von Koessler
Music of Hungary

References

 Von Dohnanyi, Ilona (2002). Ernst Von Dohnanyi: A Song of Life. Indiana University Press. 
 

Compositions by Ernst von Dohnányi
1896 compositions
Compositions in F major
Dohnanyi